Willie McCulloch (born 7 January 1948) is a retired Scottish footballer who played as a midfielder in the Scottish League for Alloa Athletic, Airdrieonians and Berwick Rangers. After his retirement as a player, he managed Cowdenbeath.

References 

Scottish footballers
Cowdenbeath F.C. players
Scottish Football League players
Association football midfielders
1948 births
Living people
Place of birth missing (living people)
Berwick Rangers F.C. players
Cowdenbeath F.C. managers
Scottish Football League managers
Scottish football managers
Camelon Juniors F.C. players
Alloa Athletic F.C. players
Airdrieonians F.C. (1878) players